Sadowo may refer to the following places:

Sadowo, Sochaczew County in Masovian Voivodeship (east-central Poland)
Sadowo, Żuromin County in Masovian Voivodeship (east-central Poland)
Sadowo, Podlaskie Voivodeship (north-east Poland)
Sadowo, Lubusz Voivodeship (west Poland)
Sadowo, Warmian-Masurian Voivodeship (north Poland)
Sadowo, West Pomeranian Voivodeship (north-west Poland)
Sądowo, Pomeranian Voivodeship (north Poland)

See also
 Sadow (disambiguation)
 Sadowa (disambiguation)
 Sadovo (disambiguation)
 Sadovy (disambiguation)